Princess Superstar Is is the fourth studio album by American rapper and producer Princess Superstar. It was released in 2001 in the United States via Rapster Records. Audio production was handled by Concetta Kirschner, The Herbaliser, DJ Mighty Mi of The High & Mighty, Chops, Curtis Curtis, Dart LA, Big Jim Slade, Lenny Lacem, and Mista Sinista. It featured guest appearances from Kool Keith, Beth Orton, J-Zone, Bahamadia, The High & Mighty, and 7even. The album spawned three singles: "Wet! Wet! Wet!", "Bad Babysitter" and "Keith 'N Me". Its lead single, "Bad Babysitter", peaked at number 11 on the UK Singles Chart, number 14 on the Belgian Ultratop 50 Singles, number 38 on the Australian Singles Chart, number 94 on the German Singles Chart.

Track listing

Sample credits
Track 2 contains elements from "Mr. Bumble" by Syd Dale (1969)
Track 7 contains elements from "Cargo Culte" by Serge Gainsbourg (1971)
Track 10 contains elements from "I Wanna Go Home" by Holly and the Italians (1981)
Track 11 contains elements from "It's a New Day" by Skull Snaps (1973)
Track 12 contains elements from "Juicy Fruit" by Mtume (1983)
Track 14 contains elements from "Light Sleeper" by Saafir (1994)
Track 16 contains elements from "Expo Tenerife" by South American Getaway (1997)

Personnel

Concetta Kirschner – main artist, producer (tracks: 5, 7, 11-13, 16), additional producer (tracks: 1, 6, 8, 10, 14), executive producer, mixing & recording (tracks: 1-8, 10-16) 
Keith Matthew Thornton – featured artist (tracks: 3, 15) 
Erik Meltzer – featured artist (track 2) 
Milo Berger – featured artist (track 2), producer (tracks: 2, 4) 
Elizabeth Caroline Orton – featured artist (track 8) 
Aaron Phillips – featured artist (track 9) 
Joel Wright – featured artist & producer (track 10), scratches (track 5)
Jay Mumford – featured artist (track 12)
Antonia Reed – featured artist (track 16)
Walter Sipser – bass (tracks: 1, 5, 8, 10-13, 15-16), additional producer (track 16)
Lee Farber – drums (tracks: 7, 16)
Curtis Webster – guitar (track 7), producer (track 1), additional producer (tracks: 6-8, 10-14, 16), mixing & recording (tracks: 1-8, 10-16)
Kester Lydon – bass (track 9)
Jake Wherry – keyboards (track 9), producer & mixing (track 9)
Oliver Lawrence Trattles – scratches (track 9), producer & mixing (track 9)
Perrin Wright – scratches (tracks: 11, 14)
Pete Kohl – guitar (track 13)
Paula Henderson – horns (track 16)
Steve Moses – horns (track 16)
John C. Parker – producer (tracks: 3, 15)
Ghetalion – producer (track 5)
Leonard Smythe – producer (track 6)
Scott Robert Jung – producer (track 8)
Big Jim Slade – producer (track 14)
Julian Crane – recording (track 8)
Paul Stadden – recording (track 8)
Nigel Laybourne – mixing (track 9)
Greg Vaughn – mastering
Ned Ambler – photography

References

External links

2001 albums
Princess Superstar albums